Léo-Paul Desrosiers (April 11, 1896 – April 20, 1967) was a Quebec writer and journalist well known for his historical novels. He was influenced by the nationalism of Henri Bourassa and Lionel-Adolphe Groulx.

He published his first novel in 1922 called Âmes et Paysages. His best-known work, Les Engagés du Grand Portage published in 1938, was set in the fur trade-years in the early 19th century. As a journalist he mainly wrote for Le Devoir.

He won the Ludger-Duvernay Prize in 1951 and the Lorne Pierce Medal in 1963.

Works
 Ames Et Paysages, (1922)
 Nord-Sud, (1931)
 Le Livre Des Mystères, (1936)
 L'Accalmie, Lord Durham Au Canada, (1937)
 Les Engagés Du Grand Portage, (1938); The Making Of Nicolas Montour [translated by Christina vol an Ooordt], (1978)
 Commencements, (1939)
 Les Opiniâtres, (1941)
 Sources, (1942)
 Iroquoisie, (1947)
 L'Ampoule D'Or, (1951)
 Les Dialogues De Marthe Et De Marie, (1957)
 Vous Qui Passez, (1958)
 Les Angoisses Et Les Tourments, (1959)
 Rafales Sur Les Cimes, (1960)
 Dans Le Nid D'Aiglons, La Colombe Vie De Jeanne Le Ber..., (1963)
 Paul De Chomedey, Sieur De Maisonneuve'', (1967)
 
Source:

References

External links
The Academy of Arts, Humanities and Sciences of Canada
Desrosiers, Léo-Paul in The Canadian Encyclopedia

1896 births
1967 deaths
20th-century Canadian male writers
20th-century Canadian novelists
Canadian male novelists
Canadian novelists in French
Writers from Quebec